Bouda is a commune in Adrar District, Adrar Province, in south-central Algeria. According to the 2008 census it has a population of 9,938, up from 8,668 in 1998, with an annual growth rate of 1.4%.

Geography

The commune of Bouda covers the northernmost end of the string of oases comprising the Tuat region of the Algerian Sahara. The oases within Bouda form a crescent-shaped arc from the northwest to southwest.

Climate

Bouda has a hot desert climate (Köppen climate classification BWh), with long, extremely hot summers and short, very warm winters, and averages just  of rainfall per year.

<div style="width:85%;">

Transportation

The villages in Bouda commune are connected by a provincial road to Adrar, the capital of the province, which lies on the N6 national highway. The nearest airport is Touat Cheikh Sidi Mohamed Belkebir Airport, located just east of Adrar.

Education

5.6% of the population has a tertiary education, and another 18.9% has completed secondary education. The overall literacy rate is 81.3%, and is 89.5% among males and 73.1% among females.

Localities
As of 1984, the commune was composed of 11 localities:

Ben Draou
Zaouit El Cheikh
Benillou
Bakhalla
Laamaryine
El Ghomara
Kessiba
El Mansour
Zaouit Sidi Haïda
Gherm Ali
Béni Oiazel

References

Neighbouring towns and cities

Communes of Adrar Province